Zakaria Sanogo (born 11 December 1996) is a Burkinabé professional footballer who plays as a winger for the Burkina Faso national team.

Career
On 5 July 2019, Sanogo signed for Ararat-Armenia. On 4 June 2022, Ararat-Armenia announced that Sanogo's contract had expired and he would leave the club.
On June 24, 2022, Sanogo signed for JS Kabylie.

Career statistics

Club

International

Scores and results list Burkina Faso's goal tally first, score column indicates score after each Sanogo goal.

Honours
Ararat-Armenia
Armenian Premier League: 2019–20
 Armenian Supercup: 2019

References

External links
 

Living people
1996 births
People from Bobo-Dioulasso
Burkinabé footballers
Association football forwards
Burkina Faso international footballers
Austrian Football Bundesliga players
African Games silver medalists for Burkina Faso
African Games medalists in football
Competitors at the 2015 African Games
2021 Africa Cup of Nations players
Rahimo FC players
Wolfsberger AC players
TSV Hartberg players
FC Ararat-Armenia players
2. Liga (Austria) players
Armenian Premier League players
Burkinabé expatriate footballers
Expatriate footballers in France
Burkinabé expatriate sportspeople in France
Expatriate footballers in Austria
Burkinabé expatriate sportspeople in Austria
Expatriate footballers in Armenia
21st-century Burkinabé people